Kuttamangalam  is a village in Thrissur district in the Indian state of Kerala.

Demographics
 India census, Kuttamangalam had a population of 16832 with 8398 males and 8434 females.

References

Villages in Thrissur district